Off Limits is a 1988 action-thriller film set during the Vietnam War starring Willem Dafoe and Gregory Hines and directed by Christopher Crowe. The term "off limits" referred to the area where the original crime took place, an area of Saigon off limits to military personnel. The name of the film was changed to Saigon or Saigon: Off Limits when it was released throughout the rest of the world.

The film marks Willem Dafoe's second Vietnam War film. He was assisted in preparing for this role by Vietnam Veteran and former Counterintelligence Special Agent Ed Murphy.  Dafoe had previously starred in Platoon and would go on to play roles in Born on the Fourth of July and Flight of the Intruder. Although set during the war, the tale is more of a mystery than a story about the war.

Plot
Sergeant First Class Buck McGriff and Sergeant First Class Albaby Perkins are two joint services Criminal Investigation Division (CID) agents on duty in war torn Saigon.  When a prostitute is found murdered they discover that the prime suspects are high ranking U.S. Army officers.  As they investigate they find that there have been a string of at least six murders in the last year, but the previous inquiry was shut down from higher up the chain of command. Investigations lead them to Colonel Dexter Armstrong, but Armstrong rules himself out of inquiries by committing suicide. With the help of a French nun Sister Nicole and their non-commissioned officer in charge, Master Sergeant Dix, they finally close in on their target. As their investigation leads them closer and closer to the murderer, they find their lives are in danger and they end up nearly being sent home. The movie ends with an unexpected twist when they rule out all their suspects by conducting an interview in a Viet Cong tunnel base, and their NCO is the killer.

Cast

Reception

The movie received a mixed reception. It holds an approval rating of 45% on Rotten Tomatoes based on 11 reviews.

Box office

The movie was not successful at the box office, grossing only $7.2 million. However, it later found its audience on home video and on cable TV, primarily HBO and Showtime.

References

External links
 
 
 
 
 
 

1988 films
1988 action thriller films
1980s war films
20th Century Fox films
American action thriller films
American buddy action films
Films directed by Christopher Crowe (screenwriter)
Films scored by James Newton Howard
Films set in Saigon
Films with screenplays by Christopher Crowe (screenwriter)
Vietnam War films
1980s English-language films
1980s American films